Wernicke's area, also called Wernicke's speech area, is one of the two parts of the cerebral cortex that are linked to speech, the other being Broca's area. It is involved in the comprehension of written and spoken language, in contrast to Broca's area, which is primarily involved in the production of language. It is traditionally thought to reside in Brodmann area 22, which is located in the superior temporal gyrus in the dominant cerebral hemisphere, which is the left hemisphere in about 95% of right-handed individuals and 70% of left-handed individuals.

Damage caused to Wernicke's area results in receptive, fluent aphasia. This means that the person with aphasia will be able to fluently connect words, but the phrases will lack meaning. This is unlike non-fluent aphasia, in which the person will use meaningful words, but in a non-fluent, telegraphic manner.

Structure
Wernicke's area is traditionally viewed as being located in the posterior section of the superior temporal gyrus (STG), usually in the left cerebral hemisphere. This area encircles the auditory cortex on the lateral sulcus, the part of the brain where the temporal lobe and parietal lobe meet. This area is neuroanatomically described as the posterior part of Brodmann area 22.

However, there is an absence of consistent definitions as to the location. Some identify it with the unimodal auditory association in the superior temporal gyrus anterior to the primary auditory cortex (the anterior part of BA 22). This is the site most consistently implicated in auditory word recognition by functional brain imaging experiments. Others include also adjacent parts of the heteromodal cortex in BA 39 and BA40 in the parietal lobe. Despite the overwhelming notion of a specifically defined "Wernicke's Area," the most careful current research suggests that it is not a unified concept.

While previously thought to connect Wernicke's area and Broca's area, new research demonstrates that the arcuate fasciculus instead connects to posterior receptive areas with premotor/motor areas, and not to Broca's area. Consistent with the word recognition site identified in brain imaging, the uncinate fasciculus connects anterior superior temporal regions with Broca's area.

Function

Right homologous area

Research using Transcranial magnetic stimulation suggests that the area corresponding to the Wernicke's area in the non-dominant cerebral hemisphere has a role in processing and resolution of subordinate meanings of ambiguous words—such as ‘‘river’’ when given the ambiguous word "bank."  In contrast, the Wernicke's area in the dominant hemisphere processes dominant word meanings (‘‘teller’’ given ‘‘bank’’).

Modern views
Neuroimaging suggests the functions earlier attributed to Wernicke's area occur more broadly in the temporal lobe and indeed happen also in Broca's area.

Support for a broad range of speech processing areas was furthered by a recent study carried out at the University of Rochester in which American Sign Language native speakers were subject to MRI while interpreting sentences that identified a relationship using either syntax (relationship is determined by the word order) or inflection (relationship is determined by physical motion of "moving hands through space or signing on one side of the body").  Distinct areas of the brain were activated with the frontal cortex (associated with ability to put information into sequences) being more active in the syntax condition and the temporal lobes (associated with dividing information into its constituent parts) being more active in the inflection condition.  However, these areas are not mutually exclusive and show a large amount of overlap.  These findings imply that while speech processing is a very complex process, the brain may be using fairly basic, preexisting computational methods.

Clinical significance

Aphasia

Wernicke's area is named after Carl Wernicke, a German neurologist and psychiatrist who, in 1874, hypothesized a link between the left posterior section of the superior temporal gyrus and the reflexive mimicking of words and their syllables that associated the sensory and motor images of spoken words. He did this on the basis of the location of brain injuries that caused aphasia. Receptive aphasia in which such abilities are preserved is also known as Wernicke's aphasia. In this condition there is a major impairment of language comprehension, while speech retains a natural-sounding rhythm and a relatively normal syntax. Language as a result is largely meaningless (a condition sometimes called fluent or jargon aphasia).

Wernicke's area receives information from the auditory cortex, and functions to assign word meanings. This is why damage to this area results in meaningless speech, often with paraphasic errors and newly created words or expressions. Paraphasia can involve substituting one word for another, known as semantic paraphasia, or substituting one sound or syllable for another, defined as phonemic paraphasia. This speech is often referred to as “word salad,” as speech sounds fluent but does not have sensible meaning. Normal sentence structure and prosody are preserved, with normal intonation, inflection, rate, and rhythm. This differs from Broca's aphasia, which is characterized by nonfluency. Patients are typically not aware that their speech is impaired in this way, as they have altered comprehension of their speech. Written language, reading, and repetition are affected as well.

Damage to the posterior temporal lobe of the dominant hemisphere is the cause of Wernicke's aphasia. The etiology of this damage can vary greatly, with the most common cause being a cerebrovascular event such as an ischemic stroke. Ischemic stroke is the result of a thrombus occluding a blood vessel, restricting blood supply to a particular area of the brain. Other causes of focal damage potentially leading to Wernicke's aphasia include head trauma, infections affecting the central nervous system, neurodegenerative disease, and neoplasms. A cerebrovascular event is more likely the cause in an acute-onset presentation of aphasia, whereas a degenerative disease should be suspected in aphasia with gradual progression over time. Imaging is often useful in identifying a lesion, with most common initial imaging consisting of computed tomography (CT) scan or magnetic resonance imaging (MRI). Electroencephalography (EEG) can also be useful in patients with transient aphasia, where findings may be due to seizures, although this is a less common cause.

Diagnosis of aphasia, as well as characterization of type of aphasia, is done with language testing by the provider. Testing should evaluate fluency of speech, comprehension, repetition, ability to name objects, and writing skills. Fluency is assessed by observing the patient's spontaneous speech. Abnormalities in fluency would include shortened phrases, decreased number of words per minute, increased effort with speech, and agrammatism. Patients with Wernicke's aphasia should have fluent speech, so abnormalities in fluency may indicate a different type of aphasia. Comprehension is assessed by giving the patient commands to follow, beginning with simple commands and progressing to more complex commands. Repetition is evaluated by having the patient repeat phrases, progressing from simple to more complex phrases. Both comprehension and repetition would be abnormal in Wernicke's aphasia. Content should also be assessed, by listening to a patient's spontaneous or instructed speech. Content abnormalities include paraphasic errors and neologisms, both indicative of a diagnosis of Wernicke's aphasia.  Neologisms are novel words that may resemble existing words. Patients with severe Wernicke's aphasia may also produce strings of such neologisms with a few connecting words, known as jargon. Errors in the selection of phonemes of patients with Wernicke's aphasia include addition, omission, or change in position. Another symptom of Wernicke's aphasia is use of semantic paraphasias or "empty speech" which is the use of generic terms like "stuff" or "things" to stand in for the specific words that the patient cannot think of. Some Wernicke's aphasia patients also talk around missing words, which is called "circumlocution." Patients with Wernicke's aphasia can tend to run on when they talk, due to circumlocution combined with deficient self-monitoring. This overabundance of words or press of speech can be described as logorrhea. If symptoms are present, a full neurologic exam should also be done, which will help differentiate aphasia from other neurologic diagnoses potentially causing altered mental status with abnormal speech and comprehension.

As an example, a patient with Wernicke's aphasia was asked what brought him to the hospital. His response was, "Is this some of the work that we work as we did before? ... All right ... From when wine [why] I'm here. What’s wrong with me because I ... was myself until the taenz took something about the time between me and my regular time in that time and they took the time in that time here and that’s when the time took around here and saw me around in it’s started with me no time and I bekan [began] work of nothing else that's the way the doctor find me that way..."

Treatment of Wernicke's aphasia first involves addressing the underlying cause. Speech and language therapy is the first line treatment for the aphasia itself, and has a goal of improving language deficits as well as preserving the patient's remaining language skills. A subsequent critical goal of therapy is to teach the patient how to communicate in alternative ways, so they can successfully communicate in daily life. This may include gestures, pictures, or use of electronic devices.

While neuroimaging and lesion evidence generally support the idea that malfunction of or damage to Wernicke's area is common in people with receptive aphasia, this is not always so. Some people may use the right hemisphere for language, and isolated damage of Wernicke's area cortex (sparing white matter and other areas) may not cause severe receptive aphasia. Even when patients with Wernicke's area lesions have comprehension deficits, these are usually not restricted to language processing alone. For example, one study found that patients with posterior lesions also had trouble understanding nonverbal sounds like animal and machine noises. In fact, for Wernicke's area, the impairments in nonverbal sounds were statistically stronger than for verbal sounds.

References

External links 
 

Cerebral cortex
Neurolinguistics
Temporal lobe